The World Apart is a lost 1917 silent film western directed by William Desmond Taylor and starring Wallace Reid and Myrtle Stedman. It was produced by Oliver Morosco Photoplay Company (Oliver Morosco) and distributed by Paramount Pictures.

Cast
 Wallace Reid as Bob Fulton
 Myrtle Stedman as Beth Hoover
 John Burton as Roland Holt
 Eugene Pallette as Clyde Holt
 Florence Carpenter as Rose de Braisy
 Henry A. Barrows as Jack King
 Phyllis Daniels as Beth's Mother (Phyllis was the mother of Bebe Daniels)

References

External links
 
 
 lobby poster

1917 films
1917 Western (genre) films
Lost Western (genre) films
Films directed by William Desmond Taylor
Paramount Pictures films
American black-and-white films
Lost American films
1917 lost films
Silent American Western (genre) films
1910s American films